The women's 200m individual medley SM12 event at the 2008 Summer Paralympics took place at the Beijing National Aquatics Center on 10 September. There were two heats; the swimmers with the eight fastest times advanced to the final.

Results

Heats
Competed from 10:03.

Heat 1

Heat 2

Final
Competed at 18:39.

Q = qualified for final.

References
 
 

Swimming at the 2008 Summer Paralympics
2008 in women's swimming